The 1913 South Sydney season was the 6th in the club's history. The club competed in the New South Wales Rugby Football League Premiership (NSWRFL), finishing the season 3rd. In the knock-out competition, the City Cup, South Sydney lost the semi final 19-10 to the eventual runner-ups of the competition - North Sydney.

Ladder

Fixtures

References

South Sydney Rabbitohs seasons
South Sydney season